Névtelen hősök  [′Nameless heroes′] is an 1880 Hungarian four-act opera by Ferenc Erkel.

References
The following sources were given:

 Legány Dezső: Erkel Ferenc művei és korabeli töténetük. Budapest, 1975. Zeneműkiadó. 
 Németh Amadé: Operaritkaságok, Zeneműkiadó, Budapest, 1980, 

Hungarian-language operas
Operas by Ferenc Erkel
1880 operas
Operas